is a former Japanese football player.

Career
Mihara played for Tokyo Verdy and Fagiano Okayama in the J2 League from 2006 to 2009, making 13 league appearances and one appearance in the Emperor's Cup for Okiyama in the last two years, and helping them win promotion from the Japanese Regional Leagues to the J2 League in 2008.

Mihara moved to the United States in 2010 to play for the Rochester Thunder in the USL Premier Development League. He made his debut for Rochester on May 15, 2010 in a game against Des Moines Menace.

Club statistics

References

External links

Official blog

1987 births
Living people
Association football people from Tokyo
Japanese footballers
Japanese expatriate footballers
J2 League players
Japan Football League players
USL League Two players
Tokyo Verdy players
Fagiano Okayama players
YSCC Yokohama players
Rochester Thunder players
Association football defenders